Kung Mangarap Ka't Magising is a 1977 Philippine coming-of-age romantic drama film co-written and directed by Mike De Leon, and starring Christopher de Leon and Hilda Koronel. It was released as Moments in a Stolen Dream overseas. Set in Baguio, it follows Joey (de Leon), a musically-inclined college student who falls for Anna (Koronel), a married young woman vacationing from Manila. As their friendship starts blossoming into romance, the two slowly uncover startling truths about each other's pasts.

Kung Mangarap Ka't Magising was released in the Philippines on December 24, 1977, as an official entry to the 1977 Metro Manila Film Festival. The film won two categories at the 2nd Gawad Urian Awards for Best Music and Best Sound. In 2016, the film was digitally restored and remastered by ABS-CBN Film Archives and Central Digital Lab., and was well received by retrospective reviews.

Plot 
Joey (Christopher de Leon), an easygoing professional student in Baguio who loves to compose music and jam with his friends, is following a course of studies his father has chosen for him. Always haunted by the memory of his dead girlfriend, he meets and gets attracted to Anna (Hilda Koronel), who is then visiting her cousin Cecile (Laurice Guillen), a professor at the university. But Joey learns that Anna is married and has a young son. Nevertheless, they become close and later Joey discovers that Anna is not happy with her domineering and too proper husband. Eventually, the couple becomes intimate and then more than friends, but though they are happy, Anna is afraid that soon reality will catch up with them.

Cast 

Christopher de Leon as Joey
Hilda Koronel as Anna
Laurice Guillen as Cecile
Danny Javier as Jojo
Boboy Garovillo as Mike
Bibeth Orteza as Nanette
Briccio Santos as Freddie
Oya De Leon as Sylvia
Moody Diaz as Ms. Laguitan

Production 
The film was mostly shot in Baguio as well as in Sagada; filming also took place in the University of the Philippines Baguio. It also served as a reunion between Christopher de Leon and Hilda Koronel who both starred in Lino Brocka's 1974 drama film Tinimbang Ka Ngunit Kulang (Weighed But Found Wanting). The two would reunite again in Brocka's 1989 film Babangon Ako't Dudurugin Kita.

According to De Leon, the "Joey's Theme" scene was his favorite part of the film but opined that the scene was "one of the most difficult and nerve-racking," for it was shot in one take.

Release 
Kung Mangarap Ka't Magising is produced by LVN Pictures (now acquired by Star Cinema) and was theatrically released in the Philippines on December 24, 1977, as an official entry to the 1977 Metro Manila Film Festival.

Digitally restored version 

In 2016, the film was digitally restored and remastered by ABS-CBN Film Archives in partnership with Central Digital Lab. The restored version was subsequently released in select cinemas for a limited period of time.

Reception 
Cathy Babao of Philippine Daily Inquirer  praised the film for its cinematography and the on-screen relationship between the lead roles of De Leon and Koronel, to which Babao says: "The chemistry between Christopher and Hilda has always been magical, captured on screen as something memorable and beautiful." Spot.PH praised Koronel as "a vision", the ensemble of Moody Diaz, Bibeth Orteza, Danny Javier and Boboy Garovillo as a "solid supporting cast", and Baguio as the romantic setting for the film. Furthermore, the review states: "As rom-coms go, the film depicts many consecutive scenes designed, as it were, to step up the kilig." NOOD.ph praised the film as "an honest and straightforward story about two people who cross each other’s paths and are faced with insurmountable odds. Plain and simple".

Accolades
At the 2nd Gawad Urian Awards, the film won Best Music for musical director Jun Latonio and Best Sound for Ramon and Luis Reyes, and was nominated for additional categories: Best Film, Best Actor (Christopher De Leon), Best Actress (Koronel), Best Director (Mike De Leon), Best Cinematography (Mike De Leon and Francis Escaler), Best Editing (Ike Jarlego Jr), and Best Production Design (Mel Chionglo).

References

External links 
 

1977 films
Philippine drama films
Philippine romantic drama films
Philippine coming-of-age films
Films directed by Mike De Leon